Hwang In-suk  (Hangul: 황인숙) is a South Korean poet.

Life
Hwang In-suk was born December 21, 1958 in Seoul, South Korea. She debuted in 1984 with the poem I'll Be Born as a Cat. As the title of her debut poem suggests, Hwang is deeply interest in society's "alley cats", the lonely, isolated existences of the city, both human and feline. In fact, Hwang admits that she still sets out water and food for the stray cats in her neighborhood. She says that although she never sees the cats she feeds, she enjoys the feeling of returning and finding the dishes empty.

Friends of Hwang have named her the "poet of the 4 haves and the 4 have-nots". The four "have-nots" are home, money, husband, and children; the four "haves" are poetry, friends, a non-possessive spirit and a giving heart.

Work
The Korea Literature Translation Institute says, about Hwang:

As in the line "A neighborhood where cats no longer live /is a neighborhood empty of the human soul" (selected passage from "Look After the Cats"), the poet values careful observance of one's surroundings, calling together the poor, shabby, lonely existences, and giving them words of comfort so that our souls do not become empty. In this way, loneliness is treated as an important theme in her poetry. Hwang says, "If you look carefully, whether spirits or humans or things, somewhere someone is muttering 'I'm lonely'". It is this "incurable disease", she says, that leads people to sink themselves in grief. Still, she finds the loneliness is not easily overcome. She writes about hopes that are always hiding somewhere. Those hopes are achieved through a poetic method that grasps at life's truths through pure language. She transmits this awareness to her readers. "Let's go back. To the beauty of language, the warmth of language, the softness of language. If we can do that, then we will grow closer to the beauty of life, the softness of life, the warmth of life."

Loneliness is an important theme in Hwang's work. The poet says, "If you look carefully, whether spirits or humans or things, somewhere someone is muttering 'I'm lonely'".

Hwang has been extremely prolific, with at least thirteen collections published since 1988.

Hwang has had at least one work published in translation, online, Above the Roof.

Awards
 1999 Dongseo Literary Award
 2004 Kim Soo-young Prize
 2018 Hyundae Munhak [Contemporary Literature] Award

Works in Korean (Partial)
Poetry Collections 
 The Birds Set the Sky Free (1988)
 Sadness Awakens Me (1990)
 We Meet Like Snowbirds (1994)
 My Gloomy, Precious One (1998)
 The Evident Stroll (2003)
 Night Train to Lisbon (2007)
Prose Collections
 I am Lonely (1997)
 The Flesh is Sad (2000
 The People on the Roof (2002)
 Writings by Hwang In-suk (2003)
 Now, Those Hearts Again (Ida Media, 2004)
 What Alleys Contain , 2005)
 Patterns of the Voice (2006)
 Days of Joy (2007)

References 

1958 births
20th-century South Korean poets
Living people
21st-century South Korean poets
South Korean women poets
20th-century South Korean women writers
21st-century South Korean women writers
People from Seoul
Seoul Institute of the Arts alumni